Jesús Narro Sancho (4 January 1922 – 1 July 1987) was a renowned footballer born in Tolosa, Guipúzcoa, Spain, on January 4, 1922. As a left midfielder he was part of Real Murcia for three seasons scoring 21 goals, Real Sporting de Gijón for part of a season as a loan, scoring one goal and at his peak he was part of the Real Madrid C.F. for six seasons scoring 13 goals and being part of the team that won the league title in his final season in La Liga with the team "merengue" along with the great Alfredo Di Stéfano.

Outstanding performances

His most outstanding performance was on January 14, 1951 by being on the initial line-up and performing a hat-trick (min. '8 '17 and '29) in the Spanish derby against FC Barcelona.

Retirement
With a total of 13.452 minutes in La Liga of Spain, starting in 150 games, 23 games in Copa del Rey Don Jesus Narro Sancho retired from professional soccer at age 31.

Professional goals

References 

1922 births
Spanish footballers
Real Madrid CF players
1987 deaths
Association football midfielders
Real Murcia players
Sporting de Gijón players
La Liga players
Footballers from the Basque Country (autonomous community)
People from Tolosa, Spain
Segunda División players